The 1954 Stanley Cup Finals was contested by the Detroit Red Wings and the defending champion Montreal Canadiens, in their fourth straight Finals. It was the second Detroit–Montreal Finals series of the 1950s. The Wings won the series 4–3 to win their second Stanley Cup in four years and sixth overall.

Paths to the Finals
Montreal defeated the Boston Bruins 4–0 to reach the Finals. Detroit defeated the Toronto Maple Leafs 4–1 to reach the Finals.

Game summaries
Tony Leswick scored the series-winning goal at 4:29 of overtime in the seventh game. In fact, Leswick's goal was one of the strangest Stanley Cup-winning goals in history, as Leswick's shot was deflected off the glove of Montreal's Doug Harvey and into the net. The Canadiens immediately skated off the ice without shaking hands with the Red Wings. This series is the most recent occasion where the seventh game of a Stanley Cup Finals was settled in overtime.

Broadcasting
CBC's coverage of games 3–5 were joined in progress at 9:30 p.m. (approximately one hour after start time). Meanwhile, CBC joined game six in at 10 p.m. (again, one hour after start time). Game seven was carried nationwide from opening the face-off at 9 p.m. Since game seven was played on Good Friday night, there were no commercials (Imperial Oil was the sponsor).

Stanley Cup engraving
The 1954 Stanley Cup was presented to Red Wings captain Ted Lindsay by NHL President Clarence Campbell following the Red Wings 2–1 overtime win over the Canadiens in game seven.

The following Red Wings players and staff had their names engraved on the Stanley Cup

1953–54 Detroit Red Wings

See also
 1953–54 NHL season

Notes

References

 Podnieks, Andrew; Hockey Hall of Fame (2004). Lord Stanley's Cup. Bolton, Ont.: Fenn Pub. pp 12, 50. 

Stanley Cup
Stanley Cup Finals
Detroit Red Wings games
Montreal Canadiens games
Ice hockey competitions in Detroit
Ice hockey competitions in Montreal
April 1954 sports events in North America
1950s in Montreal
1954 in Quebec
1954 in Detroit
Stanley Cup